The Gran Premio Città di Misano – Adriatico (also known as Memorial Viviana Manservisi) was a single-day road bicycle race held annually between Sant'Agostino and Comacchio, in the region of Emilia-Romagna, Italy from 2004 until 2010. The race was organised as a 1.1 event on the UCI Europe Tour.

Winners

External links
Official site 
Memorial Viviana Manservisi competition results at Cycling Archives

UCI Europe Tour races
Cycle races in Italy
Recurring sporting events established in 2004
2004 establishments in Italy
Defunct cycling races in Italy
Recurring sporting events disestablished in 2010
2010 disestablishments in Italy